Cooper Owen Garnos (born October 19, 1965) is an American former politician. He served in the South Dakota Senate from 2007 to 2011 and in the House from 1999 to 2006.

References

1965 births
Living people
People from Mitchell, South Dakota
University of South Dakota alumni
Ranchers from South Dakota
Republican Party members of the South Dakota House of Representatives
Republican Party South Dakota state senators
People from Presho, South Dakota